Neito is a freshwater lake group in Yamalo-Nenets Autonomous Okrug, Russia.

The water in the lakes is cleaner than in Lake Baikal. Neito is a traditional sacred site for the Nenets, the indigenous people of the region.

Geography
Lake Yambuto lies very close to the southeast. The Neito group is located north of the Arctic circle, in the central part of the Yamal Peninsula, in an area of smaller lakes of thermokarst origin. 

The three lakes are roughly aligned in a NNE / SSW direction. The Syoyakha (Сёяха) river flows westwards from the northwestern end of its shores.

See also
List of lakes of Russia

References

External links

Molluscan fauna of the lower reaches of the Syoyakha River
Technologies for Remote Detection and Monitoring of the Earth Degassing in the Arctic: Yamal Peninsula, Neito Lake
Sacred lakes
Lakes of Yamalo-Nenets Autonomous Okrug